Kristian Behrens is a Canadian economist, currently a Full Professor and Canada Research Chair at Université du Québec à Montréal.

References

Year of birth missing (living people)
Living people
Academic staff of the Université du Québec à Montréal
Canadian economists